Mіkalay Mіkіtavіch Slyonkow (26 April 1929 – 9 August 2022) was a Belarusian politician who was first secretary of the Communist Party of the Byelorussian SSR from 13 January 1983 to 6 February 1987 during the Soviet Union.

Slyunkov became a full member of the 27th Politburo on 26 June 1987, where he remained until its abolition in 1990.

References 

1929 births
2022 deaths
People from Rahachow District
Politburo of the Central Committee of the Communist Party of the Soviet Union members
Secretariat of the Central Committee of the Communist Party of the Soviet Union members
Seventh convocation members of the Soviet of Nationalities
Eleventh convocation members of the Soviet of the Union
Members of the Congress of People's Deputies of the Soviet Union
Heads of the Communist Party of Byelorussia
Recipients of the USSR State Prize
Heroes of Socialist Labour
Recipients of the Order of Lenin
Recipients of the Order of the Red Banner of Labour